Attention seeking behavior is to act in a way that is likely to elicit attention. Attention seeking behavior is defined in the DSM-5 as "engaging in behavior designed to attract notice and to make oneself the focus of others’ attention and admiration". This definition does not ascribe a motivation to the behavior and assumes a human actor, although the term "attention seeking" sometimes also assumes a motive of seeking validation. People are thought to engage in both positive and negative attention seeking behavior independent of the actual benefit or harm to health. In line with much research and a dynamic self-regulatory processing model of narcissism, motivations for attention seeking are considered to be driven by self-consciousness and thus an externalization of personality rather than internal and self-motivated behavior. Attention seeking is often caused by threats to one's self-concept and the need for social acceptance. This type of influence on behavior can result in a potential loss of a person's sense of agency, personality disorder and the behavior associated with these conditions.

Enjoying the attention of others is socially acceptable in some situations. However, an excessive need for attention can lead to difficulties in interpersonal relationships. However, as a tactical method, it is often used in combat, theatre (upstaging) and it is fundamental to marketing. One strategy often used by teachers and behavior analysts to counter various types of attention-seeking behavior is planned or tactical ignoring.

Causes

The causes of attention seeking behavior are varied. Risk factors leading to attention seeking behavior include loneliness, jealousy, low self-esteem, narcissism, rejection, and self-pity. A desire for validation is theorized as a motivation for attention seeking behavior. , no studies have evaluated the prevalence of attention seeking behavior in the general population.

One area of concern with attention seeking is misbehavior in classroom settings. Research findings appear to show that misbehavior is rooted more often in attention seeking than in other factors such as poor communication skills or lack of interest. Research has shown that parental rejection leads young students to adopt a diminished sense of self consequently resulting in the child feeling insecure, undervalued, and powerless. Experiencing rejection pushes the child to strive for acceptance through attention seeking behaviors. These children may grow in assertiveness as a means of being heard and seen. Thus, rejected children embrace attention seeking behaviors to feel some sense of security and acceptance.

Repeated attention seeking behavior is a symptom of multiple personality disorders, including narcissistic personality disorder, histrionic personality disorder. However, for borderline personality disorder, attention seeking is more often used as a stigmatising label than as an accurate clinical description. Attention seeking may have similar presentations to ADHD although they are distinguishable by motivations of impulsivity or hyperactivity.

Psychoanalytic theory posits that narcissism is related to attention seeking behavior. In the theory, an excessive need for attention or admiration is termed narcissistic supply.

A 2019 study on adolescents with narcissistic tendencies and the use of social media explores this relation between narcissism and attention seeking behavior. In the study it was found that adolescents’ social media behavior was used as a means of gaining acceptance, validation, and attention. The research suggests that the need of motives behind social acceptance mediated the link between social media use and narcissism. The research also found that attention seeking behavior increases when these adolescents experience social rejection or threats to their ego/self-image.

Stigma and criticism 
The term "attention seeking" has been the subject of criticism for its usage as a pejorative term to achieve victim blaming, especially in the context of borderline personality disorder and self harming behaviors. As an example, individuals who self-harm frequently self-conscious of their wounds and scars and feel guilty about their behavior, often associated with behavior to conceal self harm. According to a 2005 survey of 133 books containing the term, the term is often used with either no definition or a poor definition, no empirical studies specifically about attention seeking behavior were found, and there existed widespread academic disagreement on the causes and implications of attention seeking. The use of stigmatising language such as "attention seeking" is of particular prevalence in medical settings, although student exposure to psychiatric environments has shown evidence to reduce bias and stigma towards individuals with mental disorders.

Research 

There exists research on the relationship between social media usage and attention seeking behavior, among other personality traits in the Big Five personality traits in a variety of demographics.

In a 2013 study of Facebook users, it was found that agreeableness and conscientiousness were negatively correlated with attention seeking tendencies. A 2014 study found evidence suggesting that in the presence of the personality traits of histrionic personality disorder, social media reinforces attention seeking behavior in the form of vaguebooking, which is posting intentionally vague messages to elicit requests for detail. Internet trolls in social media also tend to exhibit attention seeking behavior. A 2016 study found evidence suggesting that individuals with attention seeking tendencies can benefit from the usage of social media to compensate for a lack of attention in other interpersonal areas, although this conclusion is not entirely consistent with similar studies.

A 2021 study found that experiencing phubbing by others (a form of being ignored by others) was positively correlated with attention seeking behavior, and the effect was larger in men, although narcissism was considered as an alternate explanation. A similar 2019 study found evidence correlating narcissism with attention seeking behavior.

Tactical Ignoring 

Tactical ignoring is a behavioral management strategy, used to combat attention seeking behaviors, where a person gives no outward sign of recognizing a behavior, such as no eye contact, no verbal response and no physical response to the person seeking attention. However, they are very aware of the behavior and monitor the individual to ensure their safety and the safety of others that are potentially involved.  The desired consequence of attention-seeking behavior is receiving attention in some form (positive or negative) from another person. Tactical ignoring is a technique that is often employed in the hopes that when an attention-seeking behavior no longer attracts attention, it may eventually cease. It is most frequently used in the behavioral training of children, but is suitable for changing or shunning adult behavior as well.

See also

 Münchausen syndrome
 Personality disorders – A sustained pattern of attention seeking in adults is associated with histrionic personality disorder, borderline personality disorder and narcissistic personality disorder.
 Self-destructive behavior – It is a common misconception that self-destructive behavior is inherently attention seeking, or at least that attention is a primary motive.
 Coping (psychology)
 Sadfishing
 Sensation seeking

References

Further reading
 Gewirtz, Jacob L Three determinants of attention-seeking in young children (1956)
 Gewirtz, Jacob L A factor analysis of some attention-seeking behaviors of young children Child Development (1956)
 Harvey, Eric & Mellor, Nigel Helping Parents Deal With Attention Seeking Behaviour (2009)
 Leit, Lisa & Jacobvitz, Deborah & Hazen-Swann, Nancy Conversational Narcissism in Marriage: Narcissistic attention seeking behaviors in face-to-face interactions: Implications for marital stability and partner mental health (2008)
 Mellor, Nigel Attention Seeking: A Practical Solution for the Classroom (1997)
 Mellor, Nigel The Good, the Bad and the Irritating: A Practical Approach for Parents of Children who are Attention Seeking (2000)
 Mellor, Nigel Attention Seeking: A Complete Guide for Teachers (2008)
 Smith-Martenz, Arden Attention-seeking misbehaviors (1990)

External links
 Hysteria, Drama Majors and Drama Queens
 Attention-seeking personality disorders

Attention
Parenting
Childhood
Human behavior